Psychotria taitensis is a species of plant in the family Rubiaceae. It is endemic to Kenya.

References

taitensis
Endemic flora of Kenya
Taxonomy articles created by Polbot
Endangered flora of Africa